Biglang Sibol, Bayang Impasibol is a Philippine television drama comedy series broadcast by GMA Network. Directed by Jeffrey Jeturian, it stars Celia Rodriguez, Nestor de Villa and Sylvia La Torre. It premiered on March 12, 2001 replacing Rio Del Mar. The series concluded on January 25, 2002 with a total of 228 episodes.

Cast and characters
Lead cast
 Celia Rodriguez as Nena
 Nestor de Villa as Noel
 Sylvia La Torre

Supporting cast
 Delia Razon as Luding
 Michael de Mesa as Tonito
 Princess Punzalan
 Gardo Versoza as Carlos Herrero
 Jeffrey Quizon as Epoy
 Lara Fabregas
 Lyka Ugarte
 Russel Jake Bauan as Dennis Rodman
 Alessandra de Rossi as Angela
 Gladys Guevarra as Medusa
 Carmina Manzano
 Dindin Llarena as Deedee
 Steven Claude Goyong
 Wendy Laguidao Hunter

References

External links
 

2001 Philippine television series debuts
2002 Philippine television series endings
Filipino-language television shows
GMA Network drama series
Television series by TAPE Inc.
Television shows set in the Philippines